The 1983 Winfield Australian Masters was a professional non-ranking snooker tournament that took place between 4–15 July 1983 at Channel 10 Television Studios in Sydney, Australia.

Cliff Thorburn won the tournament by defeating Bill Werbeniuk 7–3 in the final. He made the tournament's highest break, 129, in the semi-finals.

Main draw

Notes

References

Australian Goldfields Open
1983 in Australian sport
1983 in snooker